Carmen Soriano (born July 6, 1947) is a Filipina singer and actress.

Early life 
Soriano's father was Fernando Soriano. Soriano's mother was Luz Concepcion, an English teacher. Soriano is the eldest daughter and she is the 4th of six siblings.

Career 
In 1957, Soriano won the beauty pageant and became Miss Manila. Soriano earned a trip to Hong Kong.

In Hong Kong, Soriano's singing was trained by Celso Carillo, a musician. Soriano became a singer at Winner House in Hong Kong. In Manila, Soriano sang at the Manila Hotel and Bulakeña Restaurant.

Discography

Albums

Studio albums 
A Touch of Carmen
D'yos Lamang ang Nakakaalam (1977, A&W)
I Am, I Said (1977, A&W)
Malayo Man, Malapit Din (1977, A&W)

Singles 
"Ang Tangi Kong Pag-ibig" (1977)
"Bluebird"
"Bulung-Bulungan" (1977)
"Dahil sa Isang Bulaklak" (1977)
"Dalagang Pilipina" (1977)
"Di Ba't Ako'y Tao Ring May Damdamin" (1977)
"Halikan Mo at Magpaalam sa Kahapon" (1977)
"Hear My Prayer" (1969)
"I Am, I Said" (1977)
"I Honestly Love You" (1977)
"I Need to Be in Love" (1977)
"If You Walked Away" (1977)
"Kung Kita'y Kapiling" (1977)
"Kung Talagang Mahal Mo Ako" (1977)
"Lambingan" (1977)
"Mahiwaga" (1977)
"Malayo Man, Malapit Din" (1977)
"Midnight Blue" (1975)
"Minsan Pang Mag-Sumpaan" (1977)
"My Way" (1977)
"My World Keeps Getting Smaller Everyday" (1977)
"No Other Love" (1977)
"One Last Memory" (1977)
"The Best Thing That Ever Happened To Me" (1977)

Filmography

Films 
 1955 No Money No Honey - Betty.
 1957 Pintor kulapol 
 1962 Gung-Ho vs. Apache 
 1965 Secret Agent 009 
 1966 Jeepney Boys 
 1967 Love and Devotion 
 1967 The Assassin 
 1967 My Love, Forgive Me
 1967 Somebody Cares
 1967 Somewhere My Love
 1974 Limbas Squadron
 1977 Malayo man ... malapit din!
 1978 Simula ng walang katapusan

Television series 
 2010 Diva – Martin's Mom
 2011 Alakdana – Zoila's mother
 2011 Ikaw Lang ang Mamahalin – Corazon
 2013 Kakambal ni Eliana – Henrietta Monteverde
 2014–2016 The Half Sisters – Lupita Valdicañas 
 2014–2017 Wattpad Presents –  Donya Conchita
 2016–2018 Ika-6 na Utos – Margarita Fuentabella
 2016 That's My Amboy – Stella
 2017 Tadhana – Bashima
 2018–2019 My Special Tatay – Soledad Villaroman

Personal life 
At age 20, Soriano married Lloyd Samartino Sr. They had a son, Lloyd Samartino (born 1960). Soriano and Samartino's marriage ended. Soriano's second husband was Dr. Robert Dabao, who died from cancer.

See also 
 Eddie Rodriguez
 Dyna Music

References

External links 
 
 
 CARMEN SORIANO WINS CASE VS. CHARLIE DABAO (April 27, 2003)
 Mars Sharing Group: Carmen Soriano's Tips on How to Use Heels Anywhere

Filipino film actresses
20th-century Filipino women singers
20th-century Hong Kong women singers
Living people
1947 births
Filipino television actresses
Filipino beauty pageant winners
Filipino expatriates in Hong Kong
GMA Network personalities